The Metropolitan Championship, or Campeonato Metropolitano, was a professional golf tournament on the PGA of Argentina Tour, formerly the principal professional golf tour in Argentina. First held in 1955, it has always been held at the Palermo Golf Club, in Buenos Aires, Buenos Aires Province.

Winners

* – won following playoff

References

External links
Profesionales de Golf de Argentina – official site

Golf tournaments in Argentina